Lassana N'Diaye (born 3 October 2000) is a Malian professional footballer who plays as a striker for Bulgarian First League club Arda on loan from CSKA Moscow.

Club career
Born in Bamako, after playing for Guidars, N'Diaye turned professional with Russian club CSKA Moscow in October 2018. In August 2020 he moved on loan to Swedish club AFC Eskilstuna. In February 2021 he moved on loan to Veles Moscow. On 7 September 2021, he was loaned to Tekstilshchik Ivanovo for the 2021–22 season. On 3 February 2022, the loan to Tekstilschik was terminated early. On 17 February 2022, N'Diaye joined Arda Kardzhali in Bulgaria on loan until the end of the season. On 8 July 2022, N'Diaye extended his CSKA contract throughout the 2023–24 season and returned to Arda on another loan for the 2022–23 season.

International career
He represented Mali under-17s at the 2017 FIFA U-17 World Cup, finishing the tournament as the second-highest scorer. He has also played for Mali under-20s, and represented them at the 2019 FIFA U-20 World Cup.

Playing style
He models himself on Samuel Eto'o.

References

2000 births
Living people
Malian footballers
Mali youth international footballers
Mali under-20 international footballers
PFC CSKA Moscow players
AFC Eskilstuna players
FC Veles Moscow players
FC Tekstilshchik Ivanovo players
FC Arda Kardzhali players
Superettan players
Russian First League players
First Professional Football League (Bulgaria) players
Association football forwards
Malian expatriate footballers
Malian expatriate sportspeople in Russia
Expatriate footballers in Russia
Malian expatriate sportspeople in Sweden
Expatriate footballers in Sweden
Malian expatriate sportspeople in Bulgaria
Expatriate footballers in Bulgaria
21st-century Malian people